Allsup's Convenience Stores, Inc., sometimes misspelled as Allsups, is a privately owned chain of convenience stores with over 300 locations, mostly in New Mexico, West Texas, and Oklahoma. It is a 24-hour chain selling fuel under the Shell, DK, Alon, ConocoPhillips, Exxon and "Allsup's On the Go" brands. It also sells traditional convenience store items and prepared food items, and is particularly famous for their world famous burritos and chimichangas  The company's main competitors are Circle K, 7-Eleven, Stripes and Pik Quick.

History 
The original concept was established by Lonnie and Barbara Allsup in Roswell, New Mexico, in 1956, as Lonnie's Drive-In Grocery. Lonnie, a veteran of the United States Air Force who served in the Korean War, expanded the business into a small chain and sold it to 7-Eleven in 1963. With the earnings of that sale, the Allsup family relocated to Clovis, New Mexico, and began the Allsup's convenience store chain.

Allsup's is known for being the first company to introduce self-serve gas pumps. It is ranked as New Mexico's #1 privately owned corporation, and is the largest convenience store chain in the state.

The original founder, Lonnie Allsup, died in January 2018.

On October 8, 2019, Yesway entered into a definitive agreement to purchase Allsup's Convenience Stores Inc. for $235M. Yesway officially acquired Allsup's convienence stores in November 2019.  "All of us at Yesway are excited to be joining together with Allsup's, one of the most iconic and adored convenience-store chains in the country," stated Tom Trkla, chairman and CEO of Yesway. Notable changes of the store after the purchase was the styro-foam cup design. It went from being a traditionally orange and white cup with the Allsup's logo, and the cup size name on it as well. (Tallsup, etc.) It was changed to a turquoise cup with the Yesway branding. It still included the Allsups branding, but was minimized.

Even thought they are keeping the Allsup's name, the company is under Yesway ownership.

In 2020 the home office was relocated from Clovis, New Mexico to Fort Worth, Texas.

References

External links
 

Companies based in Fort Worth, Texas
Retail companies established in 1956
Convenience stores of the United States
Clovis, New Mexico
Economy of the Southwestern United States
New Mexico culture
1956 establishments in New Mexico
Roswell, New Mexico